Hao Yun (born 23 June 1995 in Hebei) is a Chinese swimmer. At the 2012 Summer Olympics, he competed in the Men's 400 metre freestyle as the only teenager, finishing in 4th place in the final.

Personal bests (long course)
.

See also
China at the 2012 Summer Olympics - Swimming

References

Swimmers from Hebei
1995 births
Living people
Chinese male freestyle swimmers
Olympic swimmers of China
Swimmers at the 2012 Summer Olympics
Olympic bronze medalists for China
Olympic bronze medalists in swimming
Place of birth missing (living people)
Medalists at the FINA World Swimming Championships (25 m)
Medalists at the 2012 Summer Olympics
Asian Games medalists in swimming
Swimmers at the 2014 Asian Games
Asian Games gold medalists for China
Asian Games bronze medalists for China
Medalists at the 2014 Asian Games